The Film Quota Act, full title the New South Wales Cinematograph Films (Australian Quota) Act was an act of legislation passed in September 1935 that came into force on 1 January 1936. Under the Act it was compulsory that in the first year of operation 5 per cent, of the films distributed in New South Wales must be Australian productions, the percentage to increase yearly for five years when it becomes 15 per cent.

The Act was introduced at the behest of New South Wales' Premier Bertram Stevens. Its ultimate impact turned out to be limited due to a loophole in the legislation. The use of the word "acquire" meant it was considered that the act was drafted to reflect exhibition of films, not ensure production; distributors argued they had no obligation to produce movies. Some American distributors made veiled threats to remove Hollywood films from exhibition.

In 1937 the New South Wales government decided not to force distributors to participate in production. Similar legislation was passed in Victoria but was never proclaimed. By the end of the decade the quota law had ceased to operate in practice.

See also
Screen quotas

References

External links
Copy of Act

Cinema of Australia
New South Wales legislation
1935 in Australian law
1930s in New South Wales
Quotas